What Not to Wear may refer to:

What Not to Wear (UK TV series), British makeover reality television series
What Not to Wear (U.S. TV series), American makeover reality television series

See also
Esquadrão da Moda, the Brazilian version of the show, airing on Sistema Brasileiro de Televisão
Ma come ti vesti?!, the Italian version of the show, airing on Real Time
Snimite eto nemedlenno (Снимите это немедленно, literally Take it off immediately), the Russian version of the show, airing on STS